Su'ad Ahmed Farah or Ma'am Su'ad Ahmed Farah (in Somali as Marwo Sucaad Axmed Faarax), is the regional vice-president of one of the nine divisions (kililoch) of Ethiopia: The Somali regional state. She is a member of the Somali regional parliament and a member of the ruling party; the Ethiopian Somali People's Democratic Party (ESPDP).

References

Ethiopian politicians
Year of birth missing (living people)
Living people
Place of birth missing (living people)